Samir Aliyev (born 14 April 1979) is a retired Azerbaijani footballer. Aliyev made 34 appearances for the Azerbaijan national football team, scoring four goals.

National team statistics

International goals

Honours
FC Kapaz
Azerbaijan Premier League: 1998–99

Personal
 Azerbaijan Player of the Year: 2002

References

External links
 affa.az 
 
 
 

1979 births
Living people
People from Tashir
Azerbaijani footballers
Azerbaijan international footballers
Azerbaijani expatriate footballers
Azerbaijani football managers
Association football forwards
FC Elista players
Khazar Lankaran FK players
FC Volyn Lutsk players
Ukrainian Premier League players
Expatriate footballers in Ukraine
Azerbaijani expatriate sportspeople in Ukraine
MOIK Baku players
Neftçi PFK players